Buffy the Vampire Slayer is an American television series created by Joss Whedon, which premiered on March 10, 1997. It concluded on May 20, 2003, after seven seasons with 144 episodes in total, plus an unaired pilot episode.

The first five seasons aired on The WB, and in 2001, it transferred to UPN for its final two seasons. In the United Kingdom, the entire series aired on Sky1 and BBC Two, and on TV3 in Ireland. The story line is continued in comic book form in Season 8, Season 9, Season 10, Season 11, and concluded with Season 12.

All seven seasons of the series are available on individual DVD box sets for Regions 1, 2 and 4. Two complete series collections (The Chosen Collection and The Complete DVD Collection) have been released separately for these regions.

Series overview

Episodes

Season 1 (1997)

Season 2 (1997–1998)

Season 3 (1998–1999)

Season 4 (1999–2000)

Season 5 (2000–2001)

Season 6 (2001–2002)

Season 7 (2002–2003)

Ratings

See also
Buffy the Vampire Slayer (film)
List of Buffy the Vampire Slayer home video releases
Buffy the Vampire Slayer Season Eight
List of Angel episodes

References

External links

List of Buffy the Vampire Slayer episodes at BuffyGuide.com

 
Lists of American action television series episodes
Lists of American fantasy television series episodes
Lists of American horror-supernatural television series episodes
Lists of American teen drama television series episodes